Trick Mirror: Reflections on Self-Delusion is a 2019 book by American author Jia Tolentino. The book consists of nine essays. Topics addressed in the essays include internet culture, "scammer culture", and contemporary feminism.

Writing and composition
Tolentino began writing the collection in early 2017 and finished it in the fall of 2018. Before the sale of the book to a publisher, Tolentino chose a "question" to address in each essay. Tolentino selected the order of the essays so that each "builds" on the previous one.

Contents
 The I in the Internet
 Reality TV Me
 Always Be Optimizing
 Pure Heroines
 Ecstasy
 The Story of a Generation in Seven Scams
 We Come from Old Virginia
 The Cult of the Difficult Woman
 I Thee Dread

Reception
The collection received mostly "Positive" reviews, according to the online literary review aggregator Book Marks. In their review, Kirkus Reviews compared Tolentino to Joan Didion and described the collection as "exhilarating, groundbreaking essays that should establish Tolentino as a key voice of her generation." Writing for Slate, reviewer Laura Miller called Tolentino "a classical essayist along the lines of Montaigne." The Guardian called Trick Mirror "a bold and playful collection of essays from a hugely talented writer." NPR's Vincent Acovino called the collection "phenomenal" and praised Tolentino's "trademark brand of freewheeling wit and intelligence."

One highly critical review, written by Lauren Oyler for the London Review of Books, received much publicity and generated so much online traffic that the London Review of Books website crashed.

For the week of August 25, 2019, Trick Mirror debuted on The New York Times Bestseller List at #2 in the category Combined Print & E-Book Non-Fiction. It remained on the list for five weeks.

References

2019 non-fiction books
American essay collections
Books about the Internet
Random House books